Aysgarth railway station is a disused railway station in North Yorkshire, England, near Aysgarth Falls. It was part of the Hawes Branch of the North Eastern Railway from its opening in 1877 until closure in April 1954.

The Wensleydale Railway Association aims to rebuild the railway from Northallerton (from its current western terminus at Redmire) to Garsdale and plans to re-open the station.

History
The station was opened by the North Eastern Railway on 1 February 1877. The line became part of the London and North Eastern Railway (LNER) during the Grouping of 1923.

The station was host to a camping coach from 1935 to 1939 and could possibly have had a coach in 1933 and/or 1934. The station was also one of those used by the LNER touring camping coach service in 1935.

The line passed to the North Eastern Region of British Railways on nationalisation in 1948.  It was closed by the British Transport Commission in April 1954, although goods traffic continued until the Redmire to Hawes section closed to all traffic in 1964.

Aysgarth site today 

The track has been lifted through the station site. The station site has now been sold on into private hands after The Wensleydale Railway stated that it was costing too much to keep on their books. The nearest track on the line runs from Redmire eastward, providing rail access for military traffic to local training areas. As of June 2022, track at the station has been re-instated.

References

Bibliography

Further reading

External links
 Aysgarth Railway Station - Video and narration
 Station on navigable O.S. map

Disused railway stations in North Yorkshire
Railway stations in Great Britain opened in 1877
Railway stations in Great Britain closed in 1954
Wensleydale
Former North Eastern Railway (UK) stations